Zhang Jianing (born 26 May 1989), also known as Karlina Zhang, is a Chinese actress. She is best known for her roles as Lin Beixing in Shining for One Thing and Muyun Yanshuang in Tribes and Empires: Storm of Prophecy.

Career
In 2009, Zhang debuted with a supporting role in the television series Auntie Duohe.

In 2010, Zhang became known to the audience after starring in the family drama  A Beautiful Daughter-in-Law Era .

In 2011, Zhang starred in the youth inspirational drama  Ant Race's Struggle  as the female lead.

In 2012, Zhang starred in the family drama Father's Love  and won the LeTV Awards for Outstanding Actress. The same year, she starred in the period melodrama Family On The Go directed by Kong Sheng, portraying a village girl. Zhang won the Best New Actress at the Tongniu Awards for her performance, as well as the Most Popular Actress award at the Jiangsu Television Awards.

In 2014, Zhang starred in the youth comedy film The Struggle of 80's  as the female lead. The same year, she starred in the medical drama The Young Doctor directed by Zhao Baogang.

In 2017, Zhang starred in the acclaimed period drama  Feather Flies To The Sky. The same year, Zhang starred in the xianxia drama Xuan-Yuan Sword: Han Cloud , as well as the fantasy historical drama Tribes and Empires: Storm of Prophecy.

In 2018, Zhang starred in the historical fiction drama  Ruyi's Royal Love in the Palace as Noble Consort Ying. The same year, she played the leading role in the historical comedy drama Tang Dynasty Tour. She then co-starred in the historical drama The Story of Minglan.

In 2020, Zhang starred in the police drama Burning, and female-centric modern drama Love Yourself.

Filmography

Film

Television series

Discography

Awards and nominations

References 

1989 births
Living people
People from Liaoyuan
Actresses from Jilin
21st-century Chinese actresses
Chinese film actresses
Chinese television actresses
Central Academy of Drama alumni